This is the list of cathedrals in Egypt sorted by denomination.

Coptic Orthodox

 Saint Mark's Coptic Orthodox Cathedral in Alexandria
 Saint Mark's Coptic Orthodox Cathedral in Cairo
 Saint Mark's Coptic Orthodox Cathedral in Azbakeya
 Saint Michael's Coptic Orthodox Cathedral in Aswan
 Cathedral of the Nativity in Cairo

Eastern Orthodox

 Cathedral of Annunciation in Alexandria (Orthodox Church of Alexandria)
 Saint Catherine's Monastery on Mount Sinai (Orthodox Church of Mount Sinai)

Catholic

 Cathedral of Saint Catherine in Alexandria (Latin Catholic)
 Our Lady of Heliopolis Co-Cathedral in Cairo (Latin Catholic)
 Co-Cathedral of Our Lady of St. Michael in Port Said (Latin Catholic)
 Cathedral of the Dormition in Alexandria (Melkite Greek)
 Cathedral of the Resurrection in Alexandria (Coptic Catholic)
 Cathedral of Our Lady of Egypt in Cairo (Coptic Catholic)
 Our Lady of Fatima Cathedral in Cairo (Chaldean Catholic)
 Cathedral of the Resurrection in Cairo  (Melkite Greek)
 Cathedral of the Annunciation in Cairo (Armenian Catholic)
 Mother of the Divine Love Cathedral in Asyut (Coptic Catholic)
 Saint George Cathedral in Giza (Coptic Catholic)
 St. Mark's Cathedral in Ismailia (Coptic Catholic)
 St. George Cathedral in Luxor (Coptic Catholic)
 Cathedral of Christ the King in Minya (Coptic Catholic)
 Cathedral of Our Lady of the Rosary in Cairo (Syriac Catholic)
 Saint Joseph Cathedral in Cairo (Maronite Catholic)

Anglican/Episcopal

 All Saints' Cathedral in Cairo

See also

List of cathedrals
Christianity in Egypt

References

Cathedrals in Egypt
Egypt
Cathedrals
Cathedrals